Piplani is a town in Bhopal, India, in the BHEL township in the city of Bhopal.

Etymology
Piplani is a derivative of Bhopal which is an adjacent village. Piplani houses the BHEL factory and offices. Nearby attractions include the NCC Grounds and the BHEL Cultural Hall.

Points of interest

Restaurants
Indian Coffee House

Balaji Restaurant

Schools
 St Theresas Girls High School
 Vikram Higher Secondary School

The Piplani has many BHEL Staff Quarters, some of which are now vacant and destroyed. The entire Piplani is divided into 4 Sectors viz A, B, C, D.

There are many beautiful temples like Jain Mandir, Ganesh Temple, Aiyappa Temple, Kalibadi Temple, Gurudwara Guru Nanak Darbar etc. which are area of attraction for locals and outsiders. 

Neighbourhoods in Bhopal